The Rev. John Graham (23 February 1794, Durham – 15 June 1865, Chester) was an English churchman and academic. He was master of Christ's College, Cambridge from 1830 to 1848 and Bishop of Chester from 1848 to 1865. Graham died at the Bishop's Palace, Chester, on 15 June 1865, and was buried in Chester cemetery on 20 June 1865. He tutored Charles Darwin at Cambridge from 1829 to 1830.

Life

Graham, only son of John Graham, managing clerk to Thomas Griffith of the Bailey, Durham, was born in Claypath, Durham. He was educated at Durham School, and at Christ's College, Cambridge
, where he attained high proficiency as a classical and mathematical scholar. In 1816 he graduated as fourth wrangler, and was bracketed with Marmaduke Lawson as chancellor's medallist, proceeding B.A. 1816, M.A. 1819, B.D. 1829, and D.D. by royal mandate in 1831. He was elected a fellow and tutor of his college in 1816, and on the resignation of Dr. John Kaye in 1830 was chosen Master of Christ's College. 

In 1828 he was collated to the prebend of Sanctæ Crucis in Lincoln Cathedral, and six years afterwards to the prebend of Leighton Ecclesia in the same diocese. He served twice as vice-chancellor of the university — in 1831, and again in 1840. It was in the latter year that he admitted Lord Lyndhurst to the office of high steward of the university, and his speech on that occasion is printed in Cooper's Annals of Cambridge Ordained in 1818, he became rector of Willingham, Cambridgeshire in 1843. He was nominated chaplain to Prince Albert on 26 Jan. 1841, and in the contest for the chancellorship of Cambridge University, 27 Feb. 1847, he acted as chairman of the prince's committee. In 1848, on the translation of John Bird Sumner to the see of Canterbury, Graham received the vacant bishopric of Chester. His consecration took place in the Chapel Royal, Whitehall, on 14 May 1848, and on 16 June he was installed in Chester Cathedral. On the occasion of his leaving Cambridge the mayor and council of the town tendered him an address of congratulation on his appointment, the only instance in which a tribute of the kind had ever been offered by that body. The bishop was a liberal in politics, but seldom spoke or voted in the House of Lords. He was a member of the Oxford and Cambridge universities commission, and took an active part in its proceedings. His manner of life was simple. His leading idea was to preserve peace in the diocese; he could, however, be firm when occasion required. His conciliatory manner was extended to the dissenters of Chester. He thus gave some offence to the high church party. 

On 25 Sept. 1849 he was appointed Clerk of the Closet to the queen, an appointment which he held to his death. He enjoyed the friendship of the prince consort and the respect of the queen. He died at the Palace, Chester, 15 June 1865, and was buried in Chester cemetery 20 June. In 1833 he married Mary, daughter of the Rev. Robert Porteous, by whom he had eight children, the eldest being the Rev. John Graham (1834–1873), registrar of the diocese of Chester.

Publications
 Sermons on the Commandments, 1826
 Sermons, 1827, 1837, 1837, 1841, 1845, 1855
 A Charge to the Clergy of the Diocese at the Primary Visitation of the Bishop of Chester, 1849

Some of his sermons are also to be found in the publications of the Church Missionary Society, the Society for Promoting Christian Knowledge, the General Society for Promoting District Visiting, and the African Church Missionary Society.

References

1794 births
1865 deaths
People from Durham, England
People educated at Durham School
Bishops of Chester
Alumni of Christ's College, Cambridge
Masters of Christ's College, Cambridge
Vice-Chancellors of the University of Cambridge
Clerks of the Closet
Burials at Chester Cathedral
19th-century Church of England bishops